Nocardiopsis gilva  is a halophilic bacterium from the genus of Nocardiopsis which has been isolated from hypersaline soil in China. The Strain YIM 90087 of Nocardiopsis gilva produces some antifungal, antibacterial and antioxidant substances.

References

External links
Type strain of Nocardiopsis gilva at BacDive -  the Bacterial Diversity Metadatabase	

Actinomycetales
Bacteria described in 2006